"We Just Wanna Party with You" is the European single from producer Jermaine Dupri and rapper Snoop Doggy Dogg that can be heard on the Men in Black: The Album soundtrack compilation album released in 1997. His first release, "Honey" and his next release "You Make Me Wanna" charted simultaneously with the M.I.B. single. All of them were produced by JD with a short emceeing also done by him.

It was the first collaboration of Snoop and JD, that was followed by "Protectors of 1472", "Bow Wow (That's My Name)" and "Welcome to Atlanta (Coast to Coast Remix)".

It was also Snoop's first single outside Death Row as being a single from an album released by Columbia/Sony and produced by JD. Singer Trey Lorenz is featured on the chorus of the song.

It only had a minor success out of the United States (where it had none, only the album charted), particularly in Australia where it stayed 17 weeks on the chart until the next year leaving the top 100 in the first week of February 1998.

The song samples Kool and the Gang's 1982 hit single "Get Down on It". The lyrics include a reference to the 1996 movie The Nutty Professor.

Charts

Notes

1997 singles
Snoop Dogg songs
Jermaine Dupri songs
Songs written by Jermaine Dupri
Songs written by Snoop Dogg
1997 songs
Song recordings produced by Jermaine Dupri
Columbia Records singles
Songs written by James Taylor
Songs written by Ronald Bell (musician)